The Malta Billie Jean King Cup team represents Malta in the Billie Jean King Cup tennis competition and are governed by the Malta Tennis Federation.  They currently compete in the Europe/Africa Zone of Group III.

History
Malta competed in its first Fed Cup in 1986.  Their best result was qualifying for the 32-team main draw in their debut year.

See also
Fed Cup
Malta Davis Cup team

External links
Tennis Academy in Malta

Billie Jean King Cup teams
Fed Cup
tennis